Aroca is a Spanish surname. Notable people with the surname include:
Fuensanta Aroca, Spanish mathematician
Miriam Díaz Aroca (born 1962), Spanish actress
Mario Edgardo Segura Aroca (born 1966), Honduran engineer and politician

Spanish-language surnames